Denise Hinrichs (born 7 June 1987 in Rostock, Mecklenburg-Vorpommern) is a German shot putter. Her personal best is 19.07 metres, achieved in May 2008 in Halle, Saxony-Anhalt. She competed at the 2008 Summer Olympics.

Achievements

References

External links
 
 
 
 
 

1987 births
Living people
Sportspeople from Rostock
German female shot putters
German national athletics champions
Athletes (track and field) at the 2008 Summer Olympics
Olympic athletes of Germany
World Athletics Championships athletes for Germany